The German National Socialist Workers' Party (DNSAP) was a protofascist party of Germans in Czechoslovakia, successor of the German Workers' Party (DAP) from Austria-Hungary. It was founded in November 1919 in Duchcov. Most important party activists were Hans Knirsch, Hans Krebs, Adam Fahrner, Rudolf Jung and Josef Patzel. In May 1932 it had 1,024 local chapters with 61,000 members.

Unlike the successive sister party in Austria, which only played a marginal role in Austrian politics, the Czechoslovak branch was able to attract a considerable number of votes because of the large Sudeten German minority in Czechoslovakia. In elections, it worked together with the Deutsche Nationalpartei (DNP). The party advocated cultural and territorial autonomy and anti-clericalism. It also showed anti-semitic tendencies. It organized fascist militia Volkssport. In October 1933 it was banned by the Czechoslovak government on the grounds of its anti-state activities. It was officially dissolved on 11 November 1933. DNSAP was succeeded by the Sudeten German Party.

Footnotes

References

External links 
Die Stellung der Deutschen zum tschechischen Staat. Referat, erstattet am 1. Gesamtparteitag der deutschen nationalsozialistischen Arbeiterpartei  by Hans Knirsch

German diaspora political parties
German nationalist political parties
Nazi parties
Interwar minority parties in Czechoslovakia
Political parties established in 1919
Political parties disestablished in 1933
Banned far-right parties
Czechoslovakia–Germany relations